Streptomyces djakartensis is a bacterium species from the genus of Streptomyces which has been isolated from soil from Djakarta on Java in Indonesia. Streptomyces djakartensis produces niddamycins and N-acetyltryptamine.

See also 
 List of Streptomyces species

References

Further reading

External links
Type strain of Streptomyces djakartensis at BacDive -  the Bacterial Diversity Metadatabase

djakartensis
Bacteria described in 1962